The Série 1900 locomotives of Portuguese Railways are 13 diesel-electric locomotives built in 1981 for freight duties. Prior to electrification, coal trains were hauled by triple-headed Série 1900 locomotives inland from the Port of Sines. The locomotives were built by Sorefame under licence from the French company Alsthom and are visually similar to SNCF Class CC 72000.

References 

Railway locomotives introduced in 1981
Alstom locomotives
Diesel-electric locomotives of Portugal
Freight locomotives